The Northolt Tunnel is a high-speed railway tunnel currently under construction in Greater London, England, and will upon completion carry the High Speed 2 (HS2) railway line under the West London suburbs.

Plans for the construction of a tunnel were first unveiled in early 2013; it was hailed as being less disruptive and quicker to construct that a surface-based alignment. An option for the tunnel's extension along the Colne Valley to replace the proposed Colne Valley Viaduct was studied but rejected as unnecessarily costly during 2015. Extensive ground surveys along the intended route were conducted during the 2010s in advance of construction work. During April 2020, it was announced that a contract worth approximately £3.3billion had been awarded to a joint venture company, Skanska Costain Strabag, for the tunnel's construction.

History 
During early 2013, it was confirmed that this section of HS2 would be constructed in a tunnel, rather than above ground. At the time, HS2 Ltd, the delivery company behind the line, stated that the use of a tunnel was the optimum solution, reducing the disruption caused by the railway's construction upon the local community while also accelerating the timetable for that portion of the route.

Prior to any construction activity commencing, numerous surveys and ground investigations were conducted along the intended route; the effort was described by Steve Reynolds, HS2’s ground investigation programme manager, as "the largest ground investigation programme that the UK has ever seen". During early 2018, a layer of black clay was discovered, which has been dubbed the "Ruislip Bed"; this material dates back 56millionyears and was formed from densely wooded marshes at the coast of a sub-tropical sea.

During the early-to-mid 2010s, the possibility of extending the tunnel to traverse the Colne Valley, as an alternative to the proposed Colne Valley Viaduct, was examined in detail. However, this option was formally dismissed in a report released in February 2015, primarily due to the increased costs and construction time that such a change would predicted to involve.

During April 2020, it was announced that a contract had been awarded to a joint venture company, Skanska Costain Strabag, for the tunnel's construction. In October 2020, it was revealed that Herrenknecht would be supplying the two tunnel boring machines (TBMs) that will be used in the boring of the western section.

Construction 
Following the completion of boring, all four TBMs are to be retrieved at the point where the two sections meet; this site will then become the Green Park Way ventilation shaft.

In advance of the tunnel's boring, a smaller logistics tunnel will be bored using a separate TBM that will facilitate access between the primary construction compound at Atlas Road and Old Oak Common Station, the launch site for the Northolt East and Euston TBMs, through which construction materials such as the precast concrete lining segments will be brought into the site and spoil removed. Delivery of the first TBMs has been scheduled to occur some time prior to the end of 2021, while boring work is set to commence during mid-2022.

The first two TBMs, named Caroline (after astronomer Caroline Herschel) and Sushila (after a local  school teacher), arrived at the West Ruislip launch site to dig the western section of the tunnel in December 2021; with TBM Sushila launching on 6 October 2022  and Caroline following suit on 27 October. Completion is currently scheduled for August 2024.

Progress 

References 

Railway tunnels in London
High Speed 2